Callicarpa acuminata is a species of beautyberry native to Latin America from Mexico to Bolivia.  Unlike the other species of this genus, C. acuminata produces small berry-like fruits which can be dark-purple or dark blue-purple. The fruit can sometimes be white. The flowers blooms are white. The fruit grow in tight clumps and sometimes resemble grapes. They are cultivated as garden trees.

Three varieties are recognized:
Callicarpa acuminata var. acuminata - from Mexico to Bolivia
Callicarpa acuminata var. argutidentata Moldenke - Tamaulipas, Honduras
Callicarpa acuminata var. pringlei (Briq.) Moldenke - eastern Mexico from Tamaulipas to Chiapas

References

External links
 Callicarpa acuminata pictures
 Callicarpa acuminata info 

acuminata
Flora of Mexico
Flora of Central America
Flora of South America
Plants described in 1818
Garden plants